Greenford Urban District was an urban district of Middlesex, England from 1894 to 1926.

It was formed from the parishes of Greenford, Perivale and West Twyford. It replaced the Brentford rural sanitary district, which covered these parishes.

It was abolished in 1926 and its former area was absorbed by the Municipal Borough of Ealing.

References

Districts of England created by the Local Government Act 1894
Urban districts of England
History of the London Borough of Ealing
History of the London Borough of Brent